Belafonte is the second studio album by American recording artist Harry Belafonte, released by RCA Victor in late 1955. The album was the first number one on the Billboard Top Pop Albums chart, topping the chart for six weeks before being knocked out of the top spot by Elvis Presley's self-titled debut album, also issued by RCA Victor.

Track listing
"Waterboy" (Avery Robinson) – 3:42 
"Troubles" (Harry Belafonte) – 3:38
"Suzanne" (Belafonte, Millard Thomas) – 3:19
"Matilda" (Norman Span) – 3:11
"Take My Mother Home" (Hall Johnson) – 6:00 
"Noah" (Belafonte, William Attaway) – 4:53
"Scarlet Ribbons" (Jack Segal, Evelyn Danzig) – 3:13
"In That Great Gettin' Up Mornin'"(Norman Luboff, Belafonte) – 3:15	 
"Unchained Melody" (Hy Zaret, Alex North) – 3:18
"Jump Down, Spin Around" (Luboff, Belafonte, Attaway) – 1:54
"Sylvie" (Huddie Ledbetter, Paul Campbell) – 5:21

Personnel
Harry Belafonte  – vocals
Millard Thomas – guitar
Bud Shank – saxophone
Jimmy Giuffre – saxophone
Buddy Childers – trumpet
Conte Candoli – trumpet
Maynard Ferguson – trumpet
Tony Scott's Orchestra
Norman Luboff Choir

See also
List of Billboard number-one albums of 1956

Notes

1956 albums
Harry Belafonte albums
RCA Victor albums